Unwrapped 2.0 is an American food-themed television series that aired on Cooking Channel. It is presented by actor Alfonso Ribeiro; and it is a revival of the series Unwrapped, which was hosted by Marc Summers. The series aired on Food Network during its first season.

Episodes

Season 1 (2015)

Season 2 (2015–2016)

Season 3 (2016–2017)

References

External links
 
 

2010s American reality television series
2015 American television series debuts
2017 American television series endings
Cooking Channel original programming
English-language television shows
Food Network original programming
Food reality television series